Tiana may refer to:

Places 
 Tiana, Catalonia, a town in the comarca of Maresme, Catalonia, Spain
 Tiana, Sardinia, a comune (municipality) in the Province of Nuoro, Sardinia, Italy

People 
 Tiana Alexandra (born 1961), Vietnamese-American actress and film director
 Tiana Benjamin (born 1984), British actress
 Tiana Brown (born 1981), American dancer
 Tiana Coudray (born 1988), American equestrian and dancer
 Tiana Lemnitz (1897–1994), German operatic soprano
 Tiana Mangakahia, Australian basketball player
 Tiana Ringer (born 1985), inactive American professional wrestler
 Tiana Xiao (born 1990), Japanese pop singer

Characters 
 Alternate name for Teana Lanster of Magical Girl Lyrical Nanoha Strikers
 The main character in the 1996 novel The Book of Ti'ana
 Tiana (The Princess and the Frog), a fictional character in a 2009 Disney film, The Princess and the Frog
Tiana, one of the minor antagonists in the anime series, Tweeny Witches

Tyana may refer to:
Tyana or Tyanna was an ancient city in the Anatolian region of Cappadocia, in modern south-central Turkey
Tyana (moth), a genus of moths of the family Nolidae
Tyana falcata, a species of moth of the family Nolidae

Television 
 Tiana (TV series), an upcoming animated series based on the 2009 Disney film, The Princess and the Frog